Ax is a surname. Notable people with the surname include:

*Emanuel Ax (born 1949), American concert pianist
James Ax (1937–2006), American mathematician
Patrick Ax (born 1979), Dutch footballer
Peter Ax (1927–2013), German zoologist

See also
AX (disambiguation)